Rödinghausen is a municipality in the district of Herford, in North Rhine-Westphalia, Germany.

Geography
Rödinghausen is situated on the southern slope of the Wiehengebirge, approx. 20 km north-west of Herford and 25 km north of Bielefeld.

Neighbouring municipalities
 Bünde
 Melle
 Preußisch Oldendorf
 Hüllhorst

Division of the municipality

Rödinghausen consists of 5 villages:
 Bieren (1,299 inhabitants)
 Bruchmühlen (3,378 inhabitants); (named Westkilver until 1969)
 Ostkilver (1,876 inhabitants)
 Rödinghausen (1,644 inhabitants)
 Schwenningdorf (2,356 inhabitants)

Mayors
 since 2020: Siegfried Lux (SPD)
 2004–2020: Ernst-Wilhelm Vortmeyer (* 1954) (SPD) 
 1999-2004: Kurt Vogt (SPD)
 1969-1998: Günter Oberpenning (SPD)

References

External links

 Official site 

Wiehen Hills
Herford (district)